Zazvitsevo is a rural locality (a village) in Sosnovskoye Rural Settlement, Vologodsky District, Vologda Oblast, Russia. The population was 7 as of 2002.

Geography 
Zazvitsevo is located 26 km west of Vologda (the district's administrative centre) by road. Knyazevo is the nearest rural locality.

References 

Rural localities in Vologodsky District